The Countryman and the Cinematograph (AKA: The Countryman's First Sight of the Animated Pictures) is a 1901 British short  silent comedy film, directed by Robert W. Paul, featuring a stereotypical yokel reacting to films projected onto a screen. The film, "is one of the earliest known examples of a film within a film," where, according to Michael Brooke of BFI Screenonline, "the audience reaction to that film is as important a part of the drama as the content of the film itself."

References

External links

 

1901 films
British black-and-white films
British silent short films
1901 comedy films
1901 short films
British comedy short films
Films directed by Robert W. Paul
Silent comedy films